James E. Bowley is Chair and Professor of Religious Studies at Millsaps College.  He received his Ph.D. in Hebrew Studies from Hebrew Union College-Jewish Institute of Religion (1992).   Bowley is a noted editor of the Dead Sea Scrolls concordance project, along with Martin Abegg, Jr., Edward Cook.  In addition to the Dead Sea Scrolls, Bowley's research and publishing focus on the  Jewish literature of the Greco-Roman World and the cultural interactions among Jews, Greeks, and later Christians, and the use of written and oral traditions in Jewish, Christian, and Islamic communities.  Bowley has also written a column for The Clarion-Ledger on religious issues of the day, and is a frequent speaker for community and scholarly events.

Bowley was the winner of the 2009 Humanities Teacher of the Year, given by the Mississippi Humanities Council.  He won the Millsaps College Distinguished Professor Award in 2016.

Research and publications
Introduction to Hebrew Bible: A Guided Tour of Israel's Sacred Library.  Prentice Hall; 1 edition (March 3, 2007).  
Living Traditions of the Bible: Scripture in Jewish, Christian, and Muslim Practice.  Chalice Press (September 17, 1999) 
The Dead Sea Scrolls Concordance: The Non-Biblical Texts from Qumran (Dead Sea Scrolls Concordance, 1) (Multilingual Edition) (v. 1) by Martin G. Abegg, James E. Bowley, Edward M. Cook, and Emanuel Tov.  Brill Academic Publishers (October 2003)  
The Dead Sea Scrolls Concordance: The Biblical Texts from the Judaean Desert (Dead Sea Scrolls Concordance, 3) (Multilingual Edition) (v. 3) by Martin G. Abegg, James E. Bowley, Edward M. Cook.  Brill Academic Publishers (October 2009)  
“Rethinking the Concept of ‘Bible’: Some Theses and Proposals,” Henoch: Historical and Philological Studies on Judaism, James E. Bowley and John C. Reeves.  XXV (2003)
“Prophets and Prophecy at Qumran” in The Dead Sea Scrolls after Fifty Years, eds. James VanderKam and Peter Flint.  Leiden: E.J. Brill, 1998, vol. 2:354-378.
A Preliminary Edition of the Unpublished Dead Sea Scrolls: The Hebrew and Aramaic Texts of Cave Four, Fascicle 4, James E. Bowley, Martin Abegg, Jr. and Ben Zion Wacholder.  New York: Biblical Archaeology Society, 1996.

References

External sources
Dead Sea Scrolls Exhibit
Clarion Ledger article December 22, 2007
Religious Studies Blog

American religion academics
Year of birth missing (living people)
Living people